, known professionally as , is a Japanese singer-songwriter, known for being one of the most popular Japanese idols of the 1980s. Since then, she is still actively releasing new singles and albums, doing annual summer concert tours, winter dinner shows, high-profile TV commercials and movies, and makes frequent TV appearances and radio broadcasts.

Due to her popularity in the 1980s and her long career, she has been dubbed the "Eternal Idol" by the Japanese media. In January 2011, the Japanese music television program Music Station listed her as the 2nd best-selling idol of all time in Japan, with 29,510,000 records sold. She placed right behind pop group SMAP and ahead of Akina Nakamori, her biggest rival from the 1980s, who was listed in third place. In 2016, however, Ian Martin of The Japan Times compared her output unfavorably with that of Hikaru Utada, describing Matsuda as "first and foremost an idol rather than an artist. Her legacy is best expressed in singles rather than albums."

Matsuda once held the record for number-one hits from 1983 to 2000 (broken by B'z) and for solo artist (broken by Ayumi Hamasaki in 2006). Matsuda was the overall finale performer of Kouhaku (Red White Music Battle) in 2014 and 2015, the prestigious NHK New Year's Eve Music show on which she has performed 24 times (until 2020).

Biography

Early life and family 
Noriko Kamachi was born on March 10, 1962, in Chikuhō, Mizuma, Fukuoka Prefecture (present-day Arakimachi, Kurume, Fukuoka Prefecture), as the eldest daughter of her parents. She was born in a state of suspended animation due to a difficult birth at Kōradai Hospital, where her aunt was the director's wife. Her father was a government official at the Ministry of Health and Welfare and her mother was from a family of former village heads from Yame. She is a descendant of Kamachi Akimori of the Kamachi clan, the lords of Yanagawa Castle who were the most powerful feudal lords in Chikugo Province in the service of the Ōtomo clan in the Sengoku period.

Career 
After winning the 'Miss Seventeen' contest held by a popular magazine in 1978, the sixteen-year-old Noriko Kamachi from Kurume, Fukuoka adopted the stage name "Seiko Matsuda" and rose to fame in 1980 as a teen idol, making her debut with the song "Hadashi no Kisetsu" (lit. "Barefoot Season"). Later in the same year, her third single "Kaze wa Aki-iro" (lit. "Wind Is Autumn Color") became the first of her 24 consecutive number one hits in Japan. She shattered the former Japanese record of nine consecutive number-ones by popular 1970s music duo Pink Lady. Her run of number-one records ended in 1989 when her 27th single "Precious Heart" ranked at number two, behind Tetsuya Komuro's "Gravity of Love". Matsuda had another number-one single "Anata ni Aitakute ~Missing You~" (lit. "I want to meet you ~Missing you~") in 1996, which would become her last number-one single to date. It was certified a million-seller by RIAJ.

Matsuda held the record for the most number-one singles (25) and most consecutive number-one singles (24) on Japan's Oricon charts for 12 years, from 1988 to 2000. Both were surpassed by B'z in late 2000. She held the record for the most number-one singles (25) by a female singer for 18 years, from 1988 till 2006, when Ayumi Hamasaki's "Startin'/Born to Be..." became her 26th single to top the charts. Matsuda's held the record for the most consecutive number-one singles (24) by a female singer and any soloist for 22 years, from 1988 to 2010. It was broken by Hamasaki's "L" in September/October 2010. Matsuda also held records for the most top-ten albums (50) and most number-one albums. Both records have since been broken by Hamasaki. Matsuda was the first artist to have a single and an album debut at No. 1 on the Oricon Chart in the same week. So far, this has only happened three times.

In a May 2011, an Oricon survey crowned her the No. 1 everlasting idol of all time, beating Momoe Yamaguchi (2), Kyōko Koizumi (3), Morning Musume (4) and Akina Nakamori (5). Her long staying power is mainly due to her continuous re-invention of herself. She was labeled a 'Mamadol' (idol who remains popular even after having children). Her hair styles, fashion sense and makeup have all been copied by millions of girls and women in Japan and in certain parts of Asia.

Matsuda's voice and singing technique have won her two best performance awards from Nippon Record Awards, first in 1983 for ガラスの林檎 (lit. Glass Apple) and again in 1993 for 'きっと、また逢える・・・' (lit. Surely, will meet again).

Matsuda began to write her songs by herself. She wrote lyrics for the first time when she produced her song "Chiisana Love Song" (lit. "Little Love Song") in 1983. This was followed by her first composed song "Canary". All lyrics of her 2007 album Baby's Breath were written by herself. It became her first completely self-produced album.

Matsuda attempted to break into the North American market with an English-language, self-titled album in 1990. She managed to score a hit – "The Right Combination", a duet with boy band New Kids on the Block singer Donnie Wahlberg. The album sales were mediocre, and her follow-up Was it the Future failed to generate significant sales. In 2002, however, Matsuda's English dance hits "All to You" and "Just for Tonight" managed to reached the Billboard dance chart at No. 8 and No. 2, respectively.

In July 2006, Matsuda's compilation album Seiko Matsuda, which consisted of 74 CDs, debuted at number 96, becoming the highest-priced album in the Oricon history at the price of 100,000 yen (about 850 dollars). Hibari Misora, a well-known enka singer from the 1950s held the previous record with her 1989 album Kyō no Ware ni Asu wa Katsu (60,000 yen).

Although some up-and-coming female singers like Namie Amuro and Hamasaki became successful after the end of the 1980s, most "typical" pop idols from Matsuda's era disappeared as the golden age of idols began to fade away, except Matsuda, who was still going strong, releasing single after single. She has been a secret idol for subsequent female celebrities such as Shoko Nakagawa who called Matsuda "God" and "My Universe". Japanese voice actress Nana Mizuki released her cover version of Matsuda's "Akai Sweet Pea" (lit. "Red Sweet Pea") as the B-side of an image song single under the character name Moka Akashiya of the anime Rosario + Vampire on 14 February 2008. There are endless cover version of Matsuda songs and tribute albums being released every year.  Among those 'Diamond Eyes', 'Missing You' and 'Akai Sweet Pea' (lit. Red Sweet Pea) and Sweet Memories have been reinterpreted by other artists countless times, including a cover performance by Akina Nakamori.

On 5 August 2009, Sony re-released 16 of Matsuda's early albums under the Blu-spec CD format. Thirteen of these entered the Oricon Top 100 Album Chart at the same time, surpassing the record set by Hibari Misora (12 albums) and making her the first female artist to do so.

Matsuda is also on the Top 3 list of Most No.1 albums, Most Top 10 singles and Most Top 10 albums for a solo artist. HMV Japan ranked her No. 10 Top Japanese Artist of All Time, and No. 7 Top Singer of All Time.

Matsuda still holds annual concerts, Christmas dinner shows and New Year's Eve Countdown shows. Despite the high ticket prices (her dinner show tickets are the most expensive among female artists) for many years and to this day, she always performs to a sold-out crowd. Matsuda is also listed as second only behind Eikichi Yazawa as an artist to have performed many concerts at the Nippon Budokan.

Matsuda made a guest appearance on one of Fox Broadcasting Company's popular TV dramas "Bones" in 2010. In 2011, she was invited to perform in American music producer Quincy Jones's concert at the Hollywood Bowl in Los Angeles. She also performed as a guest vocalist on the album "Esprit De Four" by the contemporary Jazz super-group Fourplay, released worldwide on 18 September 2012

In 2015, Matsuda won the Japanese equivalent of a Grammy Award when she received Best Vocal Performance at the Japan Record Awards, the most prestigious award in the Japan music industry. In 2020, she became one of five recipients of the Special Achievement Award at the 62nd Japan Record Awards.

Personal life 
In 1983, Matsuda was romantically linked with singer Hiromi Go. Although there were rumours of an impending engagement, Go's traditional values would have required Matsuda to give up her singing career and focus on raising a family instead. Momoe Yamaguchi, Japan's top female idol of the 1970s, had followed such a course, but Seiko ended her relationship with Go instead. Her break from tradition set a precedent for Japanese women in the 1980s and 1990s to continue their careers even after marriage.

Matsuda has been married three times. She married actor Masaki Kanda in 1985 and they divorced in 1997. Their only child and daughter, Sayaka Kanda (1986–2021), was also a singer. Her second husband, Hiroyuki Hatano, was a dentist to whom she remarried in 1998 and divorced in 2000. On 13 June 2012, she announced her third marriage to university associate professor, Hiromasa Kawana, on her official website.

In addition to music, Matsuda's career include appearances in film, radio, and television. Along with other books about Matsuda and several books of her photos including Five Seasons, No Comments, Akai Sweet Pea, have been published. Matsuda has appeared in numerous commercials, such as numerous Ezaki Glico products, Minolta, Sony, Diosa Hair Color, Suntory, DirecTV, NTT DoCoMo, Astalift, Kanebo, Doctor Drive, Takano Yuri, Alba, and Shiseido. In 2015, Matsuda caused a stir in the Japanese entertainment industry when she modelled for lingerie company, Triumph International.

On December 18, 2021, Matsuda's daughter, Sayaka Kanda, was found unconscious in the outer garden on the fourteenth floor of a hotel in Chūō ward, Sapporo. She was later pronounced dead at a hospital. The cause of death was determined to be traumatic shock, with the Hokkaido Prefectural Police suspecting that Kanda committed suicide by jumping from an upper floor of the hotel.

Discography 

 Squall (1980)
 North Wind (1980)
 Silhouette (1981)
 Kazetachinu (1981)
 Pineapple (1982)
 Candy (1982)
 Utopia (1983)
 Canary (1983)
 Tinker Bell (1984)
 Windy Shadow (1984)
 The 9th Wave (1985)
 Sound of My Heart (1985)
 Supreme (1986)
 Strawberry Time (1987)
 Citron (1988)
 Precious Moment (1989)
 Seiko (1990)
 We Are Love (1990)
 Eternal (1991)
 1992 Nouvelle Vague (1992)
 Sweet Memories '93 (1992)
 Diamond Expression (1993)
 A Time for Love (1993)
 Glorious Revolution (1994)
 It's Style '95 (1995)
 Was It The Future (1996)
 Vanity Fair (1996)
 My Story (1997)
 Forever (1998)
 Eien no Shoujo (1999)
 20th Party (2000)
 Love & Emotion Vol.1 (2001)
 Love & Emotion Vol.2 (2001)
 Area62 (2002)
 Sunshine (2004)
 Fairy (2005)
 I'll Fall in Love (2005)
 Under the beautiful stars (2005)
 Bless You (2006)
 Baby's Breath (2007)
 My Pure Melody (2008)
 My Prelude (2010)
 Cherish (2011)
 Very Very (2012)
 A Girl in the Wonder Land (2013)
 Dream & Fantasy (2014)
 Bibbidi-Bobbidi-Boo (2015)
 Shining Star (2016)
 Seiko Jazz (2017)
 Daisy (2017)
 Merry-go-round (2018)
 Seiko Jazz 2 (2019)
 Seiko Matsuda 2020 (2020)
 Seiko Matsuda 2021 (2021)

Filmography

Films 
 Nogiku no Haka (1981) (Tamiko)
 Purumeria no Densetsu Tengoku no Kiss (1983)
 Natsufuku no Eve (1984)
 Karibu Ai no Symphony (1985)
 Penguin's Memory: Shiawase Monogatari (1985) (Voice)
 Docchimo Docchi (1990)
 Final Vendetta (1996)
 Armageddon (1998) (Cameo)
 Drop Dead Gorgeous (1999)
 GEDO The Final Blade (2000)
 Sennen no Koi Story of Genji (2001)
 Shanghai Baby (2007)
 Grave of the Fireflies (2008)
 Yazima Beauty Salon The Movie (2010)
 Ramen Teh (2018)

TV 
 The Big Easy (1997) as Yuki (Episodes "Shrimp Stew" and "The Black Bag")
 Partners (2000) as Lin
 King of the Hill (2002) – Season 6, Episodes 21 & 22 (Rhythm game playing girl, and her song "Kimono Beat" is used.)
 Tatta Hitotsuno Takaramono (2004)
 Doraemon (2007) - Appearance cameo in Season 2, Episode 190 "We're Gonna Steal Mom's Diamond"
 Hanazakari no Kimitachi e (2007)
 Bones (2010) – Season 5, Episode 15 (Riku Iwanaga)
 Taira no kiyomori (2012), Gion no nyōgo

See also 
 List of best-selling music artists in Japan
 Seiko-chan cut

References

Further reading 
 Schilling, Mark (1997). "Matsuda, Seiko" in The Encyclopedia of Japanese Pop Culture. New York: Weatherhill. .

External links 
 Official website
 
 
 Sony Music public site 
 Universal Music public site 
 HMV Japan – Top 100 Japanese pop artists 

1962 births
21st-century Japanese actresses
20th-century Japanese actresses
Japanese dance music singers
Japanese electronic musicians
Japanese women pop singers
Japanese women singer-songwriters
Japanese idols
Japanese film actresses
Japanese television actresses
Japanese television personalities
Living people
20th-century Japanese women singers
20th-century Japanese singers
21st-century Japanese women singers
21st-century Japanese singers
People from Kurume
People of Shōwa-period Japan
Sony Music Entertainment Japan artists
Universal Music Japan artists
Musicians from Fukuoka Prefecture
Japanese women in electronic music
English-language singers from Japan